Joseph Dolan (February 24, 1873 – March 24, 1938) was an American professional baseball player who played 323 games over a five-season major league career between 1896 and 1901.
He was born in Baltimore, Maryland and died at the age of 65 in Omaha, Nebraska.

Career
Dolan played a total of 18 seasons including over 1,300 games in the minor leagues mostly at the Class A and D levels. Since Major League teams didn't begin affiliating league-wide with minor leagues teams until 1932, Dolan signed various contracts as a free agent with the Louisville Colonels (1896–97), Philadelphia Phillies (1899-1901), and Philadelphia Athletics (1901).

Although he'd play in 11 different minor league cities, he spent the bulk of his time, seven seasons, in Omaha where he also made his home after retiring. Interestingly, Omaha had no fewer than four nicknames during this time including the Omahogs, Indians, Rangers, and Rourkes.

After taking off a few years from baseball (he had retired in 1910), Dolan played one more season in 1913 for the Bangor Maroons at age 40. He batted .267 in 64 games (it was a 66-game season), but the league in which he played, the New Brunswick-Maine League, folded after only one season.

References

External links

Baseball players from Baltimore
Louisville Colonels players
Philadelphia Athletics players
Philadelphia Phillies players
1873 births
1938 deaths
Omaha Omahogs players
Lynchburg Hill Climbers players
Detroit Tigers (Western League) players
Minneapolis Millers (baseball) players
Richmond Bluebirds players
Omaha Indians players
Seattle Siwashes players
Omaha Rangers players
Omaha Rourkes players
Des Moines Boosters players
Winston-Salem Twins players
Columbus Discoverers players
Bangor Maroons players
19th-century baseball players